The 2011 Supersport World Championship was the thirteenth FIM Supersport World Championship season—the fifteenth taking into account the two held under the name of Supersport World Series. The season began on 27 February at Phillip Island and ended on 16 October at Portimão after twelve rounds.

With reigning champion Kenan Sofuoğlu moving to Moto2, Eugene Laverty and Joan Lascorz moving up to the Superbike World Championship, Chaz Davies emerged as the season winner, despite his bad start in the first round.

Race calendar and results
The provisional race schedule was publicly announced by FIM on 7 October 2010 with eleven confirmed rounds and two other rounds pending confirmation. Having been announced as a venue from 2011 onwards in May 2010, Motorland Aragon replaced Kyalami on the calendar, while Donington Park returned to the championship, hosting the European round. Imola was confirmed in November 2010, but Miller Motorsports Park was dropped to finalise a 12-round calendar.

Championship standings

Riders' standings

Manufacturers' standings

Entry list

All entries used Pirelli tyres.

References

External links

World
Supersport World Championship seasons